868 may refer to:
 868 (number), the number 868
 868, a year in the Common Era
 Area code 868 area code for Trinidad and Tobago in the North American Numbering Plan
 868 MHz-band (863–870 MHz), a radio frequency band used by devices such as thermostats, fire systems, burglar systems, and DIN-transceivers